The 2021 Atlantic Coast Conference women's soccer season was the 33rd season of women's varsity soccer in the conference.

Florida State and North Carolina are the defending regular season champions. The Seminoles are the defending ACC Tournament champions.

The regular season champions were the Virginia Cavaliers.  The Florida State Seminoles won the ACC Tournament and the NCAA Tournament.

Teams

Stadiums and locations 

1.  Georgia Tech does not sponsor women's soccer

Coaches

Head Coaching Records

Notes
Records shown are prior to the 2021 season
Years at school includes the 2021 season

Pre-season

Hermann Trophy Watchlist 

The Hermann Trophy Watchlist was released on August 19, 2021

Pre-season poll 
The 2020 ACC Preseason Poll was be announced on September 8, 2021.  The defending regular season champions, Florida State and North Carolina were voted in first and second place, respectively.  The leagues 14 head coaches also voted on a preseason All-ACC team.  Full results for the coaches poll and preseason team are shown below.

Pre-season Coaches Poll 

Source:

Pre-season All-ACC Team

Source:

Regular season

Conference Matrix

The table below shows head-to-head results between teams in conference play. Each team plays ten matches.  Each team does not play every other team.

Rankings

United Soccer

Top Drawer Soccer

Players of the Week

Postseason

ACC Tournament

NCAA Tournament

Awards and honors

ACC Awards

2022 NWSL Draft

References 

 
2021 NCAA Division I women's soccer season